Robin Kern and Julian Lenz were the defending champions, having won the event in 2011. 
Kyle Edmund and Frederico Ferreira Silva won the title, defeating Nick Kyrgios and Jordan Thompson 6–2, 2–6, 7–5 in the final.

Due to bad weather the matches of the first three round have been playing at the indoor courts.

Seeds

Draw

Final rounds

Top half

Bottom half

External links 
 

Boys' Doubles
US Open, 2012 Boys' Doubles